https://commons.wikimedia.org/wiki/File:Sarosa_acutior.jpg

Sarosa acutior is a moth in the subfamily Arctiinae. It was described by Felder in 1874. It is found in Ecuador and the Amazon region.

References

Moths described in 1874
Arctiinae